The 1909 Colorado Silver and Gold football team was an American football team that represented the University of Colorado as a member of the Colorado Faculty Athletic Conference (CFAC) during the 1909 college football season. In its ninth season under head coach Fred Folsom, the team compiled a perfect 6–0 record (3–0 against CFAC members), won the conference championship, was unscored upon for the season, and outscored opponents by a total of 141 to 0.

Colorado sustained a 21-game win streak that began on November 26, 1908, and ended on October 12, 1912. It remains the longest such streak in program history.

The 1909 season was the first for the CFAC; it was renamed as the Rocky Mountain Conference the following season.

Schedule

References

Colorado
Colorado Buffaloes football seasons
Rocky Mountain Athletic Conference football champion seasons
College football undefeated seasons
Colorado Silver and Gold football